Pradeep Shettar is an Indian politician who is currently a Member of Karnataka Legislative Council from Dharwad Local Authorities constituency since 6 January 2016. He is the brother of the former Chief Minister of Karnataka Jagadish Shettar.

References 

Karnataka MLAs 2013–2018
Year of birth missing (living people)
Living people
People from Hubli